The Politics of Sicily, Italy takes place in a framework of a semi-presidential representative democracy, whereby the President of Regional Government is the head of government, and of a pluriform multi-party system. Executive power is exercised by the Regional Government. Legislative power is vested in both the government and the Sicilian Regional Assembly.

History
The oldest organised party of Sicily was the Sicilian Socialist Party, founded out from the Fasci Siciliani in 1893, but the region was primarily a stronghold of the liberal establishment (see Historical Right, Historical Left and Liberals) that governed Italy for decades. However, by the end of the 19th century, Sicily elected several deputies from left-wing parties, namely the Radical Party, the Italian Republican Party, the Italian Socialist Party and the Italian Reformist Socialist Party.

After Italian Fascism (whose partisan arm, the National Fascist Party was well supported in the region) and the Allied invasion of Sicily during the World War II, Sicily increasingly became a stronghold of Christian Democracy, in opposition to the Italian Communist Party. Sicilians had also a penchant for conservative/nationalist politics, represented mainly by the Monarchist National Party and the Italian Social Movement.

After the dissolution of these parties, in the early 1990s, the region was long governed by a "centre-right coalition", notably including the Union of Christian and Centre Democrats, whose regional leader, Salvatore Cuffaro, served as President of Sicily from 2001 to 2008, Silvio Berlusconi's Forza Italia and the post-fascist National Alliance. Cuffaro's Christian Democrats have since been the main party of government in Sicily as they had been part both of the administrations of Raffaele Lombardo of the Movement for the Autonomies (2008–2012) and that of Rosario Crocetta of the Democratic Party (since 2012).

Legislative branch

The Sicilian Regional Assembly is composed of 90 members (or deputies). 80 deputies are elected in provincial constituencies by proportional representation using the largest remainder method with a Droop quota and open lists, while 10 councillors (elected in a general ticket) come from a "regional list", including the President-elect. One seat is reserved for the candidate who comes second.

The Assembly is elected for a five-year term, but, if the President suffers a vote of no confidence, resigns or dies, under the simul stabunt, simul cadent clause introduced in 2001 (literally they will stand together or they will fall together), also the Assembly is dissolved and a snap election is called.

Executive branch

The Regional Cabinet (Giunta Regionale) is presided by the President of the Region (Presidente della Regione), who is elected for a five-year term, and is currently composed by 11 members: the President and 10 regional assessors (Assessori, literally "aldermen"), including a Vice President (Vice Presidente).

Originally appointed by the Sicilian Regional Assembly, since 2001 de jure, he is elected by popular vote every five years under universal suffrage: the candidate who receives a plurality of votes, is elected.

His office is connected to the Regional Assembly (ARS), which is elected contextually: one fifth of the assembly seats are generally reserved to his supporters, which are wholesale elected concurrently with the President. The Assembly and the President are linked by an alleged relationship of confidence: if the President resigns or he is dismissed by the Assembly, a snap election is called for both the legislative and the executive offices, because in no case the two bodies can be chosen separately. The popular election of the President and the relationship of confidence between him and the legislature, allow to identify the Sicilian model of government as a particular form of semi-presidential system.

The President of Sicily promulgates regional laws and regulations. He can receive special administrative functions by the national government. The President is one of the 90 members of the Regional Assembly and, in this capacity, he can propose new laws. He appoints and dismiss the Regional Cabinet (called Giunta Regionale in Italian). The Cabinet is composed by regional assessors (assessori, literally "aldermen") who can be members of the Council at the same time. Assessors should not be confused with the ministers: according to Italian administrative law, assessors only receive delegations from the President to rule a bureau or an agency, the Region being a single legal person, not divided in ministries. One assessor can be appointed vice president. The President can also appoint four under-secretaries (sottosegretari) to help the President in his functions.

The Regional Cabinet prepares the budget, appoints the boards of public regional agencies and companies, manages assets, develops projects of governance, and resorts to the Constitutional Court of Italy if it thinks that a national law may violate regional powers. The President and the Cabinet are two different authorities of the Region: in matters within its competence, the Cabinet has the power to vote to give its approval.

List of presidents

The current President of Sicily is Renato Schifani, who is serving for his first term after winning the 2022 regional election.

Local government

Provinces
Sicily was divided in nine provinces, which were a traditional form of local administration in the region. Socialist and Christian-democratic ideas had an early diffusion in quite all the provinces around World War I. After the Fascist parenthesis, left-wing parties found their strongholds in central agricultural provinces, especially in the Province of Enna, but they didn't succeed in local elections, while Christian Democracy obtained high scores in others parts of the Region.

On 19 March 2013 the Sicilian Regional Assembly decided to turn them into Free Associations of Municipalities (Liberi consorzi tra comuni). Finally, on 30 July 2015 the Regional Assembly approved a law which put into force the Free Associations of Municipalities, regulating their functions and abolishing definitively the nine historical provinces. The same law created the new Metropolitan Cities of Palermo, Messina and Catania.

Municipalities
Sicily is also divided in 390 comuni (municipalities), which have even more history, having been established in the Middle Ages when they were the main places of government.

Provincial capitals

Others with 50,000+ inhabitants

Parties and elections

Latest regional election

References

External links
Sicilian Region
Sicilian Regional Assembly
Constitution of Sicily

 
Sicily